David Pender (born December 4, 1987) is a former American football cornerback. He was signed by the Philadelphia Eagles as an undrafted free agent in 2010. He played college football at Purdue.

Pender has also been a member of the Baltimore Ravens, Indianapolis Colts and Cincinnati Bengals.

Professional career

Philadelphia Eagles
After going undrafted in the 2010 NFL Draft, Pender signed with the Philadelphia Eagles as an undrafted free agent on April 26, 2010. He was cut on September 3, 2010.

Baltimore Ravens
He was signed to the Baltimore Ravens practice squad on September 8, 2010. He was later waived on September 21.

Indianapolis Colts
Pender was signed to the Indianapolis Colts practice squad on November 10, 2010. He was promoted to the active roster on December 8, 2010. He was waived on December 27 having only played in 2 games for the Colts.

Cincinnati Bengals
Pender was claimed off waivers by the Cincinnati Bengals on December 28, 2010. He was waived on September 3.

References

External links
 Cincinnati Bengals bio
 Purdue Boilermakers bio
 ESPN.com bio

1987 births
Living people
Sportspeople from Georgia (U.S. state)
Players of American football from Georgia (U.S. state)
American football cornerbacks
Purdue Boilermakers football players
Indianapolis Colts players
Cincinnati Bengals players
People from Charlton County, Georgia